Fabrice Vandeputte (born 22 September 1969) is a French professional football manager and former player who is the head coach of Championnat National 2 side Caen B. As a player, he was a midfielder.

Club career 
Vandeputte, who was a midfielder, started out his career at Standard FC de Montataire, joining Lille, where he would feature for the B team, later on. In 1989, he moved to Division 2 Louhans-Cuiseaux. In four seasons at the club, he made a total of 109 league appearances, and scored 14 goals. He would then sign for Beauvais, a club also in the Division 2; there, he made 23 appearances in one season under the coaching of Vahid Halilhodžić.

After 1994, Vandeputte pursued his career in amateur divisions of French football. He went through Saint-Leu and Stade Montois before signing for Chantilly as player-manager in January 1998.

International career 
In the early parts of his career, Vandeputte was minimally selected with France youth teams.

Managerial career 

Vandeputte was first player-manager at Chantilly for three and a half seasons before becoming U19 coach at Louhans-Cuiseaux from 2003 to 2004. He subsequently managed Dijon's B team, helping them win their group of the Championnat de France Amateur 2 in the  season. In 2008, he joined Sochaux's B team as a member of the staff. Four years later, in 2012, he was appointed manager of the team, a role he stayed at until 2015.

In 2015, Vandeputte began to coach Lens's U19 team. In his first season in charge, he led them to the Coupe Gambardella Final, but they suffered a 3–0 loss against Monaco, finishing as runners-up. In 2017, he headed to Bourg-en-Bresse's B team, where he would stay at for one season, moving to coach Caen's B team in 2018.

Caen 
Vandeputte only stayed in the position of B team coach at Caen for four months, because in November 2018, he stepped up as assistant manager for the first team after being promoted by Fabien Mercadal. However, he eventually went back to his role of B team coach in July 2019. In November 2020, Vandeputte was appointed as head of youth development at the club.

On 23 March 2021, Vandeputte was appointed as head coach of Caen following the sacking of Pascal Dupraz. Cédric Hengbart, Vandeputte's assistant in the reserve side, joined him as assistant manager of the senior side. At the end of the season, Caen managed to stay in Ligue 2, finishing 17th. Vandeputte would return to coach the reserve side, and was succeeded by Stéphane Moulin.

Personal life 
Vandeputte was born in Mazingarbe, a town near Lens in the Pas-de-Calais department.

Here, he met footballers such as Zinedine Zidane, Pascal Nouma, Nicolas Ouédec, Xavier Gravelaine, and Guillaume Warmuz.

Honours

Manager 
Dijon B
 Championnat de France Amateur 2: 

Lens U19
 Coupe Gambardella runner-up: 2015–16
Caen B

 Championnat National 3: 2019–20

References

External links 
 
 

1969 births
Living people
Sportspeople from Pas-de-Calais
French footballers
Association football midfielders
Lille OSC players
Louhans-Cuiseaux FC players
AS Beauvais Oise players
FC Saint-Leu 95 players
Stade Montois (football) players
US Chantilly players
French Division 3 (1971–1993) players
Ligue 2 players
Championnat National players
Championnat National 2 players
Division d'Honneur players
Championnat National 3 players
French football managers
Association football player-managers
Association football coaches
US Chantilly managers
Louhans-Cuiseaux FC non-playing staff
Dijon FCO non-playing staff
RC Lens non-playing staff
Football Bourg-en-Bresse Péronnas 01 non-playing staff
Stade Malherbe Caen non-playing staff
Stade Malherbe Caen managers
Championnat National 3 managers
Championnat National 2 managers
Ligue 2 managers
Footballers from Hauts-de-France